Robinson Cancel Castro (born May 4, 1976) is a Puerto Rican former professional baseball catcher. He made his Major League Baseball debut for the Milwaukee Brewers on September 3, 1999. He would not appear at the major league level again until June 4, 2008, when he was called up by the New York Mets.

Career
On June 15, 2008, Cancel pinch-hit for Pedro Martínez in the bottom of the sixth inning with the bases loaded. Cancel singled to center field, driving in two runs; this single was the game-winning hit, giving Martínez his 211th career win. It was Cancel's first hit in the majors since 1999.

Cancel hit his first career home run as a member of the Mets on August 11, 2008 against Zach Duke of the Pittsburgh Pirates, coming almost nine years after Cancel's Major-League debut with the Brewers. He began the 2009 season in the minors, and was called up on July 30.

Cancel spent the 2010 season with the Long Island Ducks of the Atlantic League of Professional Baseball until the Houston Astros signed him in March 2011. On May 28, 2011, Cancel was called up after Humberto Quintero was placed on the 15-day disabled list with a high right ankle sprain.

Cancel retired in 2013. The Atlanta Braves hired Cancel to manage the Gulf Coast League Braves club for 2015 season. Cancel is currently the manager of the Fresno Grizzlies  minor league baseball team. He became manager of the Tomateros de Culiacán for the 2018-19 Mexican Pacific League following Lorenzo Bundy's departure.

See also
 List of Major League Baseball players from Puerto Rico

References

External links

1976 births
Living people
Arizona League Brewers players
Atlanta Braves coaches
Beloit Snappers players
Binghamton Mets players
Buffalo Bisons (minor league) players
Durham Bulls players
Edinburg Coyotes players
El Paso Diablos players
Helena Brewers players
Houston Astros players
Huntsville Stars players
Indianapolis Indians players
Long Island Ducks players
Louisville RiverBats players
Major League Baseball catchers
Major League Baseball players from Puerto Rico
Memphis Redbirds players
Mexican League baseball catchers
Mexican League baseball first basemen
Mexican League baseball left fielders
Mexican League baseball second basemen
Midland RockHounds players
Milwaukee Brewers players
Montgomery Biscuits players
New Orleans Zephyrs players
New York Mets players
Oklahoma City RedHawks players
Pennsylvania Road Warriors players
People from Lajas, Puerto Rico
Petroleros de Minatitlán players
Puerto Rican expatriate baseball players in Mexico
Somerset Patriots players
Stockton Ports players
Springfield Cardinals players
St. Lucie Mets players
Sultanes de Monterrey players